Soubise is a commune in the Charente-Maritime department in southwestern France.

It is situated on the left bank of the river Charente opposite Rochefort and is a former shipbuilding centre.

Population

See also
Communes of the Charente-Maritime department

References

Communes of Charente-Maritime
Burial sites of the House of Rohan